Events in the year 1953 in Portugal.

Incumbents
President: Francisco Craveiro Lopes 
Prime Minister: António de Oliveira Salazar

Events
 8 November - Legislative election

Sport
In association football, for the first-tier league seasons, see 1952–53 Primeira Divisão and 1953–54 Primeira Divisão; for the Taça de Portugal seasons, see 1952–53 Taça de Portugal and 1953–54 Taça de Portugal. 
 28 June - Taça de Portugal Final
 Establishment of AD Os Limianos
 Establishment of Vilaverdense FC

Births
 1 March - Carlos Queiroz, football manager

References

 
Portugal
Years of the 20th century in Portugal
Portugal